Condensing osteitis is a periapical inflammatory disease that results from a reaction to a dental related infection.  This causes more bone production rather than bone destruction in the area (most common site is near the root apices of premolars and molars). The lesion appears as a radiopacity in the periapical area hence the sclerotic reaction.  The sclerotic reaction results from good patient immunity and a low degree of virulence of the offending bacteria.  The associated tooth may be carious or contains a large restoration, and is usually associated with a non-vital tooth. It was described by Dr. Carl Garré in 1893.

Cause
Infection of periapical tissues of a high immunity host by organisms of low virulence which leads to a localized bony reaction to a low grade inflammatory stimulus.

Diagnosis
1- TENDERNESS ON VERTICAL PERCUSSION.

Differential diagnosis
1- Idiopathic osteosclerosis.
2- cementoblastoma.
NOTE: An abnormal result with pulp testing strongly suggests condensing osteitis and tends to rule out osteosclerosis and cementoblastoma.

Treatment
The process is usually asymptomatic and benign, in most cases the tooth will require root canal treatment. endodontic treatment.

The offending tooth should be tested for vitality of the pulp, if inflamed or necrotic, then endodontic treatment is required as soon as possible, while hopeless teeth should be extracted.

Prognosis
The prognosis is excellent, once root canal treatment is completed.
If the offending tooth is extracted, the area of condensing osteitis may remain in the jaws indefinitely, which is termed osteosclerosis or bone scar.

References

External links 

Inflammations
Osteitis
Pathology of the maxilla and mandible